TEDA Football Stadium (Simplified Chinese: 泰达足球场) is a football stadium in Tianjin, China. It is the home of Tianjin Jinmen Tiger F.C.  The stadium holds 37,450 people and was built in 2004. The stadium is located in the Tianjin Economic-Technological Development Area (TEDA), and was designed by Peddle Thorp Architects, an Australian architecture firm.

References

External links
 Project of the Month: TEDA Soccer Stadium  from parsons.com (November 2004)

Football venues in Tianjin
Sports venues in Tianjin